Brickellia subuligera is a Mexican species of flowering plants in the family Asteraceae. It is widespread across much of northern and central Mexico, from Tamaulipas west to Chihuahua and south as far as Guerrero.

References

External links
Photo of herbarium specimen at Missouri Botanical Garden, collected in Nuevo León

subuligera
Flora of Mexico
Plants described in 1847